Selenyphantes is a genus of sheet weavers. It was first described by Willis J. Gertsch & L. I. Davis in 1946.

Species
 it contains six species, found in Costa Rica, Mexico and Guatemala.
Selenyphantes costaricensis Silva-Moreira & Hormiga, 2021 – Costa Rica
Selenyphantes gaimani Silva-Moreira & Hormiga, 2021 – Mexico
Selenyphantes iztactepetl Silva-Moreira & Hormiga, 2021 – Mexico
Selenyphantes longispinosus (O. Pickard-Cambridge, 1896) (type) – Mexico
Selenyphantes orizabae Silva-Moreira & Hormiga, 2021 – Mexico, Guatemala
Selenyphantes volcanicus Silva-Moreira & Hormiga, 2021 – Mexico

See also
 List of Linyphiidae species (Q–Z)

References

Linyphiidae
Monotypic Araneomorphae genera
Spiders of Central America
Spiders of Mexico